Todd Michael Marchant (born August 12, 1973) is an American former professional ice hockey player who played 17 seasons in the National Hockey League (NHL). He played nine seasons with the Edmonton Oilers and almost six seasons with the Anaheim Ducks, along with just over a season with the Columbus Blue Jackets and a game with the New York Rangers. He also played 49 games in the American Hockey League (AHL) between his time with the Binghamton Rangers and Cape Breton Oilers.

Career

Early career
Marchant played high school hockey at Williamsville East High School. He then played two years in the NCAA with Clarkson University, from 1991–1993.  He was drafted by the Rangers in the 1993 NHL Entry Draft in the seventh round, 164th overall.  In 1993–94, his first pro season, he played games with the Rangers, their AHL affiliate in Binghamton. He was acquired by the Oilers in a trade for Craig MacTavish and continued play with their affiliate in Cape Breton (and in his last couple of seasons with the Oilers, had the distinction of being one of the few NHL players to be coached by an ex-player for whom he was once traded).

Edmonton Oilers
Marchant played nine full seasons as an Oiler (1994–2003), serving as an alternate captain for his last few seasons in Edmonton.  He was known as one of the fastest players in the NHL, and used his speed mostly in a defensive capacity.  He scored the first round Game 7 overtime goal that eliminated the Dallas Stars from the 1997 playoffs, taking a pass from alternate captain Doug Weight and speeding by a stumbling Grant Ledyard to score on Andy Moog. Marchant would go on to lead all players in shorthanded goals in the 1997 playoffs, with 3. In doing so, he became the first player in 8 years to score 3 shorthanded goals in the playoffs. The last player to do it was Chicago Blackhawks forward Wayne Presley in 1989.

Columbus Blue Jackets
In the summer of 2003, Marchant was signed by the Blue Jackets after he gained early unrestricted free agency from the Oilers. He played the full 2003–04 season with Columbus, along with fellow ex-Oilers Tyler Wright and Luke Richardson.

Marchant then refused to waive his no-trade clause, which would have allowed Columbus to send him to Anaheim as part of the Sergei Fedorov trade.  After trading for Fedorov, Columbus placed Marchant on waivers in order to circumvent his no-trade clause.  Anaheim picked Marchant up on waivers on November 21, 2005 to make him a Mighty Duck.

Anaheim Ducks

Marchant played with the Mighty Ducks in the last half of the 2005–06 NHL Season. Marchant and the Ducks advanced all the way to the Western Conference Finals but were eliminated by Marchant's former team, the Edmonton Oilers.

He returned to the roster of the newly named Anaheim Ducks for the 2006–07 NHL season. The season began as a record-breaking year, with the Ducks setting franchise records and also setting a league-wide record for the longest streak of being undefeated in regulation at the beginning of the season.

Marchant was injured halfway through the year, missing over 20 games. He did not return to play in good condition until the Ducks were midway through the 2007 NHL Playoffs. Marchant returned in the series against the Detroit Red Wings in the Conference Final, and played a vital role in killing penalties. Marchant went on to win his first Stanley Cup when the Ducks defeated the Ottawa Senators in the 2007 Stanley Cup Finals.

The Ducks were eliminated in the first round of the 2008 Stanley Cup Playoffs by the Dallas Stars, a series in which Marchant scored twice. He contributed 5 goals during the 2008-09 NHL Season as the Ducks entered the playoffs as the last seed and upset the first seed San Jose Sharks. Marchant scored the game-winning goal in triple overtime in Game 2 of the Ducks second round series with the Detroit Red Wings, a series Detroit would ultimately win in seven games.

Marchant announced his retirement after 17 seasons in the NHL on June 29, 2011. He finished with the distinction of having played the most games by a player drafted in the 1993 NHL Entry Draft with 1195. He stayed with the Ducks in a front office capacity as the Director of Player Development and remains well as an assistant coach for the Anaheim Jr. Ducks Mite A club.  In 2022, he was fired from his NHL front office duties following the resignation of former GM Bob Murray.

Personal life
Todd and wife Caroline Marchant have four children; daughters Lillian and Ashley & sons Timothy Todd and Bradley David, who was born on April 20, 2009. He also hosts a weeklong hockey clinic for kids ages 8 to 15 during the offseason at the Amherst Pepsi Center.  100% of profits from his school go to charities for disadvantaged youth around Western New York.

Career statistics

Regular season and playoffs

International

Awards and honors

See also
List of NHL players with 1000 games played

References

External links

1973 births
American men's ice hockey centers
Anaheim Ducks coaches
Anaheim Ducks players
Binghamton Rangers players
Cape Breton Oilers players
Clarkson Golden Knights men's ice hockey players
Columbus Blue Jackets players
Edmonton Oilers players
Ice hockey people from Buffalo, New York
Ice hockey players from New York (state)
Ice hockey players at the 1994 Winter Olympics
Living people
Mighty Ducks of Anaheim players
New York Rangers draft picks
New York Rangers players
Olympic ice hockey players of the United States
Stanley Cup champions
People from Williamsville, New York
Clarkson University alumni